Ben van Dael (born 3 March 1965 in the Netherlands) is a Dutch football manager.

References

Dutch football managers
Living people
1965 births